Cyclobutanone is an organic compound with molecular formula (CH2)3CO.  It is a four-membered cyclic ketone (cycloalkanone).  It is a colorless volatile liquid at room temperature. Since cyclopropanone is highly sensitive, cyclobutanone is the smallest easily handled cyclic ketone.

Preparation
The Russian chemist Nikolai Kischner first prepared cyclobutanone in 1905.  He synthesized cyclobutanone in a low yield from cyclobutanecarboxylic acid in several reaction steps. This process is cumbersome and inefficient by today's standards.

More efficient, high-yielding syntheses have since been developed. One strategy involves degradation of five-carbon building blocks. For example, the oxidative decarboxylation of cyclobutanecarboxylic acid was improved by the use of other reagents and methods. A newer, more efficient preparation of cyclobutanone was found by P. Lipp and R. Köster in which a solution of diazomethane in diethyl ether is reacted with ketene. This reaction is based on a ring expansion of the cyclopropanone intermediate initially formed, wherein molecular nitrogen is split off. The reaction mechanism was confirmed by a reaction using 14C-labeled diazomethane.

Another synthesis of cyclobutanone involves lithium-catalyzed rearrangement of oxaspiropentane, which is formed by epoxidation of the easily accessible methylenecyclopropane.

Cyclobutanone can also be prepared in a two step procedure by dialkylation of 1,3-dithiane with 1-bromo-3-chloropropane followed by deprotection to the ketone with mercuric chloride (HgCl2) and cadmium carbonate (CdCO3).

Reactions
At about 350 °C, cyclobutanone decomposes into ethylene and ketene.   The activation energy for this [2+2] cycloelimination is 52 kcal/mol. The reverse reaction, the [2+2] cycloaddition of ketene and ethylene, has never been observed.

See also
Other cyclic ketones:
 Cyclopropanone
 Cyclopentanone
 Cyclohexanone

References

4
Cyclobutanes
Substances discovered in the 1900s